Davis Bottom is a neighborhood just southwest of downtown Lexington, Kentucky, United States. Its boundaries are Broadway to the south, CSX railroad tracks to the west, High Street to the north, and Maxwell Street to the east. The area is also referred to as Davistown.

The area has seen a boon in development in recent years as several abandoned tobacco warehouses have been razed with new condominiums built in their place. The Newtown Pike Extension is being built along the neighborhood's southern tier which has caused the displacement of many of the residents.

Neighborhood statistics

 Population: in 2000: 36
 Area: 
 Population density: 2,143 people per square mile
 Median household income (2010): $24,229

References

Neighborhoods in Lexington, Kentucky